What's Next(?) may refer to:
 "What's Next", the official name for the Disney advertising slogan "I'm going to Disney World!"
 "What's Next" (Drake song)
 "What's Next" (Leaders of the New School song)
 "What's Next?" (Off! song)
 "What's Next?" (Godsmack song)
 What's Next (album), a 1980 album by Frank Marino & Mahogany Rush